Fosravuconazole (trade name Nailin) is a triazole antifungal agent.  In Japan, it is approved for the treatment of onychomycosis, a fungal infection of the nail.  It is a prodrug that is converted into ravuconazole.

The Drugs for Neglected Diseases Initiative and the Japanese pharmaceutical company Eisai are studying fosravuconazole as a potential treatment for eumycetoma.

References 

Triazole antifungals
Fluoroarenes
Thiazoles
Phosphinates
Nitriles
Prodrugs